This is a list of all of the numbered passenger train services operated by the Korean State Railway, separated by train class. Even/odd pairs indicate train trips in opposing directions, the most recent comprehensive schedules are from 2002. Trains confirmed only by another source are marked in blue.

Express trains (Numbers 0-99)

Semi-express trains (Numbers 100-199)

Regional trains (Numbers 200-299)
Sometimes referred to as "Long distance trains".

Local trains (Numbers 300-999)
Frequently referred to as commuter trains depending on the context.

Foreign train numbers

Unnumbered trains
These services are verified by means other than schedules, and thus the numbers are not known. It is unclear if the narrow gauge railways are assigned numbers or not.
Hambuk Line commuter trains
Sechon Line commuter trains
Hongui Line long distance service
Kangwon Line 1980's Pyongyang-Wonsan service
Manpo Line commuter trains
Paektusan Chongnyon Line local trains
Samjiyon Line original services
Pyongbu Line 1980's long distance train
Songrim Line 1920's trains
Pyongnam Line services
Namdong Line services
Tasado Line commuter trains
Tokhyon Line commuter trains
Chongnyon Ichon Line commuter service
Hwanghae Chongnyon Line commuter trains
Ongjin Line commuter trains
Kaechon Line commuter trains
Musan Line local/commuter trains
Pukbunaeryuk Line commuter trains
Pyongbuk Line commuter trains
Supung Line commuter trains
Sinhung Line passenger services

References 

Rail transport in North Korea